André Trương Trọng Thi (1936–2005) was a Vietnamese-French engineer. He is considered to be the "father of the personal computer" for his 1973 creation along with French inventor François Gernelle of the Micral N microcomputer based on an Intel 8008 processor, one of the world's first commercial microcomputer.

Early life
Trương Trọng Thi was born in 1936 in Cholon (Saigon).  When he was 14 years old, he arrived in France to study, and later studied at the École française de radioélectricité (now EFREI). After working for Schlumberger and Intertechnique for some time, he formed the company R2E (Réalisation d'Études Électroniques) in 1971.

In 1973, thanks to François Gernelle and a team of engineers, his company created the Micral, the first non-kit, microprocessor based personal computer in the world.  It was created two years before the MITS Altair of Micro Instrumentation and Telemetry Systems arrived on the market. In 1981, R2E was absorbed by Groupe Bull.

The Micral computers were turned into a line of PC-compatibles in 1983. André Truong Trong Thi resigned from Bull, and joined the company Normerel formed by J. R. Tissot, a former member of R2E management. He developed the Oplite personal computer for Normerel. Normerel was in 1988 the third French computer maker after Groupe Bull and SMT Goupil. 
   
In 1995, he formed APCT, a software company specializing in cryptography. In 1999, he was awarded the Légion d'honneur.

He died on April 4, 2005 in Paris after being hospitalized for two and a half years.

External links
A Talk with the Father of Computing - Wired Magazine
Death of Andre Truong, inventor of the microcomputer - ZDNet France. Published on April 6, 2005
"Cha đẻ của máy vi tính" - Kỹ sư gốc Việt Trương Trọng Thi qua đời (the father of the personal computer passes away)Vietnam Television

French people of Vietnamese descent
20th-century French engineers
Vietnamese engineers
1936 births
2005 deaths
20th-century engineers